A garron or garran, from Gaelic gearran, is a type of a small sturdy horse or pony. The term occurs in Scotland and in Ireland, and generally refers to an undersized beast.

In Scotland, a garron is one of the types of Highland pony.  It is the larger, heavier type bred on the mainland. The Isles' type of pony is generally smaller and slightly finer, but still within the breed standard.  There is less difference today than there once was between these two types.

The word garron has also been used to describe a Highland cross of a Clydesdale horse with ponies. It was used in farming, especially in the Highlands and Islands where a full-sized Clydesdale would not have been as economical. These horses were valued for their hardiness and ability to work on slopes. Highland deer-stalking estates kept garrons to bring the stags off the hill, as some still do, for tradition or where ATV access is not yet practicable.

Mentions in literature
Garrons are mentioned a number of times in George R. R. Martin's fantasy series A Song of Ice and Fire. There, garrons are used in cold mountainous areas, generally to the North near the Wall.

The word is used by R. S. Surtees in the first chapter of Jorrocks′ Jaunts and Jollities.

The author Nigel Tranter mentions garrons frequently in his novels about Scottish history, for example "Macbeth, the King".

See also 
 Garrano, an ancient Portuguese variety of pony.

References

Types of horse
Horse breeds
Horse breeds originating in Scotland